We'll Take Manhattan may refer to:
 We'll Take Manhattan (1990 film), a TV show featuring Jackée Harry
 We'll Take Manhattan (2012 film), a BBC television biopic about photographer David Bailey and model Jean Shrimpton's photographic assignment in New York
Gen13: We'll Take Manhattan (2000), a book by Scott Lobdell, Ed Benes, and John Layman 
“We'll take Manhattan, the Bronx and Staten Island too”, a lyric from Rodgers and Hart's song  “Manhattan” sung by Dinah Washington

See also
 "First We Take Manhattan", a song by Leonard Cohen